There are at least two notable theaters called the Maryland Theater or Maryland Theatre

Maryland Theater (Baltimore) (defunct)
Maryland Theater (Hagerstown)